Lydia Luce is a folk/americana singer-songwriter and multi-instrumentalist based in Nashville, Tennessee. Brought up in Fort Lauderdale, Florida, Luce learned how to play viola and guitar from her mother, who conducted her own symphony orchestra. Her mother was also an organ and a piano player, and her brother, a cellist. By age 13, Luce was performing with her mother's orchestra Ars Flores.

Luce is a Berklee College of Music graduate, who after graduation moved to Washington D.C. to work at The Smithsonian and Folkways Records. She then left for Los Angeles where she received a master's degree from UCLA in viola performance before moving to Nashville.

Career 
In 2015, Luce released her first EP The Tides. In 2016, she finished as a finalist at the Rocky Mountain Folk Fest songwriting competition and toured with Sam Outlaw as a fiddle player. In 2017, Luce performed at Merlefest and AmericanaFest, and also toured as an opening artist for Peter Bradley Adams. Her debut album Azalea, released in 2018, was produced by Jordan Lehning and Skylar Wilson.

Luce has also recorded with Joe Pisapia, Joshua Hedley, Eminem, Dolly Parton and Willie Nelson.

Discography

Albums/EPs 

 The Tides EP (2015)
 Azalea (2018)
 Azalea Strings EP (2019)
 Dark River (2021)

Singles 

 Sausalito (2018)
 Helen (2018)
 Azalea (2018)
 Like You Do (2018)
 Golden Days (2019)

See also 

 List of singer-songwriters

References

Further reading

 Frahm, Jonathan. (March 28, 2018). Lydia Luce Looks Back on Life in "Sausalito" (premiere). PopMatters.
Pettican, Luke. (June 29, 2018). Premiere: Lydia Luce's "Helen" Depicts Love in an Intoxicating Way. Atwood Magazine.
McKenna, Brittney. (July 12, 2018). Lydia Luce Heads To The Mojave Desert In Video For "Azalea." American Songwriter.
McHugh, Sean. (September 25, 2018). Now/It's: Something to Listen to - 'Azalea' by Lydia Luce. Now/Its.
Carroll, Brian. (April 2, 2019). Fresh Track: Lydia Luce "My Heart in Mind" (String Sessions). Red Line Roots.

External links 
 Official website
 Lydia Luce on Musicbrainz

Living people
American women singer-songwriters
American folk musicians
21st-century American women singers
Berklee College of Music alumni
University of California, Los Angeles alumni
Year of birth missing (living people)
21st-century American singers
American singer-songwriters